Campestre is a municipality located in the south of the Minas Gerais. Its population is 21,054 (2020) and its area is 54 km².

References

Municipalities in Minas Gerais